Nurit  is a 1972 Israeli drama film written, produced and directed by George Ovadiah.

It sold 702,000 tickets and is the 13th most watched Israeli film ever.

Plot
Shoshana (Yona Elian), a rich young woman from Tiberias loves Moshe (Sasi Keshet), a poor truck driver from Tel Aviv. They intend to marry, but Nissim, her father (Jacques Cohen), forbids it. They intend to take advantage of Nissim's business trip to Argentina to fulfill their romantic wishes. But an unfortunate mishap happens when Shoshana hears on the radio that Moshe has been involved in an accident and she thinks he was killed. She travels to the Sea of Galilee wishing to commit suicide like her mother did years ago. At the last minute she changes her mind. She is hit by a car driven by three strange man and is blinded. The three men take care of her and Nurit, her young baby from Moshe. They become a street entertainment group: the three men play music, Shoshana sings and Nurit dances. After eight years, Moshe changes his name to Mike and becomes a famous singer, while Shoshana has eye surgery and regains her eyesight, and then Mike marries Shoshana.

See also
 Cinema of Israel
 Bourekas film

References

External links
 
 Nurit in Book of Israeli films

1972 films
1972 drama films
Israeli drama films
Films set in Israel